The Council of the Notariats of the European Union (CNUE) is a nonprofit organisation of notaries from 22 European countries. The CNUE is the official body representing the notariat in dealings with the institutions of the European Union. Speaking for the profession, it expresses the joint decisions of its members to the European Union.

History 
The Conference of the Presidents of the Notariats of the six founding countries of the European Economic Community (Belgium, France, Germany, Italy, Luxembourg, and the Netherlands) was founded in Paris in 1976, with its memorandum of understanding signed under the auspices of and within the framework of the International Union of Notaries.

In 1989, the Conference of the Presidents became the Permanent Conference of the Notariats of the European Community, thereby affirming its nature as a supranational association of notaries. In 1995, it became the Conference of the Notariats of the European Union (CNUE), and then adopted its current name of Council of the Notariats of the European Union on January 1, 2006. In 1996 the CNUE introduced a one-year presidency system, following the model of other European institutions.

Since 1992, the CNUE has been constantly evolving, in terms of both its internal structure and its functions. Over the years the CNUE has become progressively larger, first with the addition of Spain, Portugal, and Austria. Nine additional notariats became members in 2004 in parallel with the enlargement of the EU, enabling the organisation to make a significant leap from 10 to 19 members. Bulgaria and Romania joined in 2007, bringing the number of member notariats to 21 of the 27 EU Member States. On July 1, 2013, the Croatian notariat also joined the CNUE.

Members 
The CNUE represents the Latin-type notariats of all EU Member States familiar with this institution: 

The Turkish notariat (Turkiye Noterler Birligi) gained observing member status in March 2013.

The European notariats are represented in the CNUE by the presidents of the national notarial bodies. The CNUE is supervised by a President, the CNUE's spokesperson, who has tenure for one year, renewable for one year.

Mission 
The CNUE's mission is to promote the notariat as a cornerstone of preventive justice. It contributes actively to any decision-making processes of the European institutions. This involves areas including the legal aspects of citizenship and running a business, access to justice and consumer protection.

Furthermore, the CNUE keeps its members updated on developments in European legislation and any initiatives taken by the EU institutions. It also assists in the continuous training of notaries in European Union law.

The CNUE does not, however, limit itself only to following EU work; it also makes proposals. It implements projects with a European dimension involving all its members, with the aim of constructing the area of justice, freedom and security expected by European citizens.

References

External links 
 

1976 establishments in France
Organizations established in 1976
International law organizations
Organisations based in Brussels
Law in Europe